Commission for Agricultural Costs and Prices (CACP) is a decentralised agency of the Government of India. It was established in 1965 as the Agricultural Prices Commission, and was given its present name in 1985. It is an advisory body, not statutory, attached to the Ministry of Agriculture & Farmers Welfare, Government of India.

Mission
The commission was established to recommend Minimum Support Prices (MSPs), to motivate cultivators and farmers to adopt the latest technology in order to optimise the use of resources and increase productivity.

Composition 
Currently, the Commission consists of -

The non-official members are representatives of the farming community and usually have an active association with the farming community.

Recommendations
As of now, CACP recommends MSPs of 23 commodities:

7 cereals (paddy, wheat, maize, sorghum, pearl millet, barley and ragi), 
5 pulses (gram, tur, moong, urad, lentil),
7 oilseeds (groundnut, rapeseed-mustard, soyabean, seasmum, sunflower, safflower, nigerseed)
4 commercial crops (copra, sugarcane, cotton and raw jute).

References

Agricultural organisations based in India
1965 establishments in Delhi
Agricultural Union
Indian commissions and inquiries
Government agencies established in 1965